Purnell House may refer to:

George Washington Purnell House, Snow Hill, Maryland, listed on the U.S. National Register of Historic Places (NRHP)
James C. Purnell House, Winona, Mississippi, NRHP-listed
Purnell House (Goshen, New Hampshire), listed on the U.S. National Register of Historic Places (NRHP)

See also
Purnell (disambiguation)